Bratina is a surname. Notable people with the surname include: 

 Bob Bratina (born 1944), Canadian broadcaster and politician
 Darko Bratina (1942–1997), Italian sociologist, film theorist and politician
  (born 1939), Slovene architect